The Romania national under-20 football team represents Romania in international football at this age level and is controlled by Federația Română de Fotbal, the governing body for football in Romania.

Honours 
 FIFA U-20 World Cup:
 Third Place (1): 1981

Individual awards

Results and fixtures

Players

Current squad
 The following players were called up for the 2022–23 Under 20 Elite League matches.
 Match dates: 17 and 21 November 2022
 Opposition:  and 
 Caps and goals correct as of:' 26 September 2022, after the match against 

Recent call-ups
The following players have also been called up to the Romania under-20 squad and remain eligible:

Notes
INJ = Player withdrew from the squad due to an injury
SUS = Player is serving suspension
WD = Player withdrew from the squad
Names in italics'' denote players that have been capped for the Senior team.

See also
 Romania national football team
 Romania national under-21 football team
 Romania national under-19 football team
 Romania national under-17 football team
 FIFA U-20 World Cup

References

External links
 Football Association of Romania
 Tournament archive at fifa.com
 FIFA U-20 World Cup at rsssf

European national under-20 association football teams
Football